The Superga air disaster occurred on 4 May 1949, when a Fiat G.212 of Avio Linee Italiane (Italian Airlines), carrying the entire Torino football team (popularly known as the Grande Torino), crashed into the retaining wall at the back of the Basilica of Superga, which stands on a hill on the outskirts of Turin. All thirty-one people on the flight died.

Background 
The Avio Linee Italiane Fiat G.212CP was carrying the team home from Lisbon, where they had played a friendly match with S.L. Benfica in honour of the Portuguese captain, Francisco Ferreira. In the incident, the whole active Torino team (almost all of the Italy national football team) lost their lives. Club officials including the manager, Ernő Egri Erbstein, a Hungarian refugee, and the coach, Englishman Leslie Lievesley, also perished in the accident, as well as the crew and three well-known Italian sports journalists: Renato Casalbore (founder of Tuttosport); Renato Tosatti (the Gazzetta del Popolo, father of Giorgio Tosatti), and Luigi Cavallero (La Stampa). The task of identifying the bodies was entrusted to the former manager of the Italy national team, Vittorio Pozzo, who had called up most of Torino's players to the Azzurri.

The full-back Sauro Tomà did not take part in the trip due to an injured meniscus, nor did the reserve goalkeeper, Renato Gandolfi (the third goalkeeper, Dino Ballarin, took his place). Radio commentator Nicolò Carosio, Luigi Giuliano (captain of the Torino youth team), and former manager of the Italy national team Vittorio Pozzo, were excluded for various reasons. Torino's president, Ferruccio Novo, did not go on the trip because of influenza.

Crash 

The three-engined Fiat G.212, with aircraft registration I-ELCE, of Avio Linee Italiane, took off from Lisbon at 09:40 a.m. on Wednesday, 4 May 1949. The commander of the aircraft was Lieutenant Colonel Meroni. The flight landed at the airport in Barcelona at 13:00. While the aircraft was refuelled during the stopover, Torino met for lunch with Milan, who were on their way to Madrid.

At 14:50, I-ELCE set off for the Turin-Aeritalia Airport. The flight's route was to take it over Cap de Creus, Toulon, Nice, Albenga, and Savona. Above Savona, the plane turned north, in the direction of the capital of Piedmont, where it was expected to arrive in 30 minutes. The weather in Turin was poor; at 16:55, the airport of Aeritalia communicated the weather situation to the pilot: clouds almost touching the ground, showers, strong southwest wind gusts, and very poor horizontal visibility.

At this point, the tower asked for the pilot's position. After a few minutes of silence (at 16:59) came the reply: "Quota . QDM on Pino, then we will cut at Superga". At Pino Torinese, which is located between Chieri and Baldissero Torinese, southeast of Turin, there was a VDF radio station (VHF direction finder), to provide a QDM (magnetic course to be taken on a head on approach as a radio aid) on request.

One theory for the deviation is that due to the strong left crosswinds, the plane could have suffered a drift to starboard, which shifted from the axis of descent and lined up with the hill of Superga.

At 17:03, the plane made a turn to the left, returned to level flight, and had aligned to prepare for landing when it crashed into the back of the embankment of the Basilica of Superga. The pilot, who likely believed that the Superga hill was off to his right, would have seen it suddenly emerge directly in front of him (speed , visibility ) and been unable to react. The wreckage did not give any indication of an attempt to go around. The only part of the aircraft which remained partially intact was the empennage.

At 17:05, Aeritalia Torre called I-ELCE, but received no response. Of the 31 people on board, none survived.

Victims

Players 
 Valerio Bacigalupo
 Aldo Ballarin
 Dino Ballarin
 Émile Bongiorni
 Eusebio Castigliano
 Rubens Fadini
 Guglielmo Gabetto
 Ruggero Grava
 Giuseppe Grezar
 Ezio Loik
 Virgilio Maroso
 Danilo Martelli
 Valentino Mazzola
 Romeo Menti
 Piero Operto
 Franco Ossola
 Mario Rigamonti
 Július Schubert

Coaching staff 
 Ottavio Corina, massage therapist
 Ernő Egri Erbstein, manager
 Leslie Lievesley, coach

Club officials 
 Arnaldo Agnisetta, general manager
 Andrea Bonaiuti, travel organizer
 Ippolito Civalleri, travel escort

Journalists 
 Renato Casalbore
 Luigi Cavallero
 Renato Tosatti

Flight crew 
 Cesare Biancardi, co-pilot
 Celestino D'Inca, engineer
 Pierluigi Meroni, pilot
 Antonio Pangrazi, radio operator

Aftermath
At the request of rival teams, Torino were proclaimed winners of the 1948–49 Serie A season on 6 May 1949, and the opponents, as well as Torino, fielded their youth teams in the four remaining games. On the day of the funeral, half a million people took to the streets of Turin to give a final farewell to the players. The following season, the other top Italian teams were asked to donate a player to Torino. The shock of the crash was such that the following year, the Italy national team travelled to the 1950 FIFA World Cup in Brazil by ship.

The crash is commemorated annually. Remains of the aircraft, including a propeller, a tire, scattered pieces of the fuselage, and the personal bags of Mazzola, Maroso, and Erbstein, are preserved in a museum in Grugliasco near Turin. The Museo del Grande Torino e della Leggenda Granata, located in the prestigious Villa Claretta Assandri of Grugliasco, was opened on 4 May 2008, the anniversary of the tragedy. Eight of the 18 players (as well as two coaches and the journalist Renato Casalbore) are buried at the Cimitero Monumentale of Turin.

See also
 List of accidents involving sports teams

Bibliography
 Roberto Thoeni, L'ultimo urlo per il grande Torino, Abaco Editori
 Dino Buzzati, in La nera di Dino Buzzati, Oscar Mondadori
 Vincenzo Baggioli (a cura), Il Torino. Oltre la vita!, Milano, I.P.L.

References

External links
Memorial museum page (in Italian)

Aviation accidents and incidents in 1949
1949 in Italy
Airliner accidents and incidents caused by weather
Alitalia accidents and incidents
Aviation accidents and incidents in Italy
Aviation accidents and incidents involving controlled flight into terrain
Aviation accidents and incidents involving professional sports teams
Torino F.C.
Sport in Turin
1940s in Turin
1948–49 in Italian football
May 1949 events in Europe
Superga